Vicki Michele Roberts (born July 3, 1959) is an American attorney and an on-air legal commentator, as well as a television and film personality.

Born in Long Island, New York, Roberts obtained a degree in Radio, Television, and Film from California State University, Northridge in 1980. She graduated from Southwestern University School of Law in Los Angeles, California in 1982, and was admitted to the California State Bar in 1983, and to the New Jersey State Bar in 1986. Roberts served as Judge Pro Tem for the Los Angeles Municipal Court from 1984 through 1990. She is a civil and criminal litigator, appellate practitioner, and has been called on as an on-air legal commentator. She was a series regular on Celebrity Justice and Jury Duty.

Roberts has served as the personal attorney of Gary Busey, David Carradine and Michael Madsen, and she was a leading attorney contributor to Beyond a Reasonable Doubt, edited by Larry King.

Filmography

References

1959 births
Living people
American women lawyers
Southwestern Law School alumni
California State University, Northridge alumni
People from Long Island
21st-century American women